Richard Dunn (23 December 1919 – December 1985) was an English footballer who played in the Football League for West Ham United and Hartlepools United as an inside-forward.

Born in Easington, Dunn began his career at Ferryhill Athletic before moving to West Ham United in 1937. Dunn had not made a first-team appearance before the outbreak of the Second World War and served with the Essex Regiment and Royal Artillery after hostilities commenced.

Dunn spent over six years in the Army and made guest appearances for Hartlepools United, Preston North End and York City, as well as 35 appearances for West Ham in the League South, where he scored 23 goals. He also made an appearance for Tottenham Hotspur in September 1944, when he was called on as a spectator after the Spurs team had arrived with just four players.

After the war, Dunn made his competitive debut for West Ham on 9 September 1946, along with goalkeeper George Taylor, in a 3–2 defeat at Fulham. He made 11 appearances in the Second Division before moving to Hartlepools United.

References

1919 births
1985 deaths
Military personnel from County Durham
Sportspeople from Easington, County Durham
Footballers from County Durham
English footballers
Association football inside forwards
Ferryhill Athletic F.C. players
West Ham United F.C. players
Hartlepool United F.C. players
English Football League players
British Army personnel of World War II
Royal Artillery soldiers
Hartlepool United F.C. wartime guest players
Preston North End F.C. wartime guest players
York City F.C. wartime guest players
Tottenham Hotspur F.C. wartime guest players
Essex Regiment soldiers